Tryblidiidae is an extinct family of paleozoic monoplacophorans in the superfamily Tryblidioidea.

Genera 

Genera in the family Tryblidiidae include:
 Tryblidium Lindström, 1880. From Ordovician and Silurian.
 Drahomira Perner, 1903
 Drahomira barrandei
 Drahomira glaseri
 Drahomira kriziana
 Drahomira rugata
 Helcionopsis Ulrich & Scofield, 1897
 Pentalina Horný, 1961
 Pentalina prantli Horný, 1961
 Pilina

References

Prehistoric monoplacophorans
Prehistoric mollusc families